Oronoque is a census-designated place (CDP) in the town of Stratford, Fairfield County, Connecticut, United States. It is in the northern part of the town, bordered to the north by the city of Shelton, to the east by the Housatonic River, and to the south by the Merritt Parkway. Connecticut Route 110 (Main Street) runs north–south through the community. The administrative offices of Sikorsky Aircraft are in the eastern part of the CDP, between Route 110 and the Housatonic River.

Oronoque was first listed as a CDP prior to the 2020 census.

References 

Census-designated places in Fairfield County, Connecticut
Census-designated places in Connecticut
Connecticut placenames of Native American origin